The Renault Eurocup Mégane Trophy was a one-make racing series created and managed by Renault Sport. The  series has raced with the Renault Mégane Renault Sport since 2005 as part of the World Series by Renault. The Renault Eurocup has run with various models under differing names since 1976.

History
The Eurocup use a single Renault produced vehicle. The series use cars according to era and the championship name is so altered :
 Coupe d'Europe Renault 5 Alpine (1976–1980)
 Coupe d'Europe Renault 5 Turbo (1981–1984)
 Europa Cup Renault Alpine V6 Turbo (1985–1988)
 Europa Cup Renault 21 Turbo (1989–1991)
 Europa Cup Renault Clio (1992–1995)
 Renault Sport Spider Elf Trophy (1996–1998)
 Renault Sport Clio Trophy (1999–2004)
 Eurocup Mégane Trophy (2005–2008)
 Eurocup Mégane Trophy Mk. II (2009–2013)

Scoring system
Here is the current scoring system for races in the Eurocup Mégane Trophy:

There was a point awarded for pole position up until prior to the start of the 2010 season.

Champions

See also
 Renault Clio Cup
 Dacia Logan Cup
 Sports Renault

References

DriverDatabase driverdb.com
Cup Racers renaultoloog.nl

External links
World Series by Renault: Megane Trophy official website
World Series by Renault - Eurocup Megane Trophy official website 2

 
Touring car racing series
Recurring sporting events established in 1976
Recurring events disestablished in 2013